The AA-12 (Auto Assault-12), originally designed and known as the Atchisson Assault Shotgun, is an automatic combat shotgun developed in 1972 by Maxwell Atchisson (however, the original development by Atchisson seems to have produced only a few guns at prototype-level, with the development that ultimately lead to the gun entering the market being done later by Military Police Systems, Inc.). The most prominent feature is reduced recoil. The current 2005 version has been developed over 18 years since the patent was sold to Military Police Systems, Inc. The original design was the basis of several later weapons, including the USAS-12 combat shotgun. The shotgun fires in fully automatic mode only. However, the relatively low cyclic rate of fire of around 300 rounds per minute enables the shooter to fire semi-automatically de facto with brief trigger pulls. It is fed from either an 8-shell box magazine or a 20-shell drum magazine.

History
In 1987, Max Atchisson sold the rights of the AA-12 to Jerry Baber of Military Police Systems, Inc., Piney Flats, Tennessee. MPS in turn developed the successor simply known as Auto Assault-12, which was redesigned over a period of 18 years with 188 changes and improvements to the original blueprint, modifications included changing the AA-12 from blowback- to gas-operated with a locked breech. "When the bolt flies back after firing to cycle another round, around 80% of what would normally be felt as recoil is absorbed by a proprietary gas system. A recoil spring grabs another 10%, leaving the final recoil a remarkable 10% of the normal recoil for a 12-gauge round—so you can point the AA-12 at a target and unload the full magazine without significant loss of accuracy". MPS also teamed up with Action Manufacturing Company, and Special Cartridge Company to combine the gun with FRAG-12 High-Explosive ammunition into a multifunction weapon system.

The CQB model has a 13-inch barrel, and is half a pound lighter than the regular model. Uncommon in other automatic shotguns, the AA-12 fires from an open bolt, a feature more commonly found in submachine guns, as well as heavy and squad-level machine guns. It uses 8-round box or 20-round drum magazines, as opposed to the original 5-round box magazine. Due to the abundant use of stainless steel and the designed clearance for fouling, MPS has stated that the weapon requires little to no cleaning or lubrication. The designer states that cleaning is required after 10,000 rounds. A rail system is also available for modern sighting options. Because of an open bolt design, the AA-12 can reportedly operate after being submerged in water.

Ammunition
The AA-12 is capable of firing various types of 12-gauge ammunition such as buckshot and slugs.

Usage
By 2004, ten firing models of the AA-12 had been produced  and were demonstrated to the United States Marine Corps, who did not adopt the weapon.

The HAMMER unmanned defense system by More Industries proposed to use dual-mounted AA-12s on the H2X-40 turret. Neural Robotics also wanted to mount the weapon on their AutoCopter unmanned aerial vehicle.

See also
 List of shotguns
 Pancor Jackhammer
 Saiga-12
 Armsel Striker

References

Weapons and ammunition introduced in 1972
API blowback firearms
Automatic shotguns
Shotguns of the United States